The Queen's Commonwealth Trust (QCT) is a charity that supports young people aged 18-35 across the Commonwealth. The focus is on social entrepreneurs who have founded organisations to address problems in their communities. Queen Elizabeth II was the charity's patron.

History and mission 
QCT was launched on 21 April 2018 (Queen Elizabeth II's 92nd birthday) with her patronage and her grandson Prince Harry, Duke of Sussex as president.  After marriage, Harry's wife Meghan was appointed vice president later that year. The couple retained their positions until February 2021.

The Trust connects young changemakers across the Commonwealth for peer learning and collaborations though its young leaders network hub  

In March 2019, The Queen’s Trust gave QCT its final funds of £2,672,287 from a planned run-down.

In 2021 model Naomi Campbell became a global ambassador for QCT.

In the financial year 2020/2021 articles were published in British media alleging that QCT paid nearly all of its income on staff costs, £787,314 of the £796,106 it raised.  

QCT later published a statement disputing the allegations and noting that their total spend in 2020-21 was £1.528million, of which over 80% was on charitable activities.

Projects Supported

2019 OYW Partnership 
In 2019, The Queen’s Commonwealth Trust partnered with One Young World (OYW) to offer QCT Scholarships to 53 young leaders – one from every Commonwealth country – to attend the 2019 OYW Summit in London, UK from 22–25 October. One Young World is a preeminent global forum for young leaders who have demonstrated a commitment to effecting positive change. The organization received over 5,000 applications, out of which 53 were selected. Following is the list of 2019 QCTxOYW scholarship winners, the first cohort.

References

External links 
 

 
 

Organizations established in 2018
Charities based in London